Turridrupa weaveri is a species of sea snail, a marine gastropod mollusk in the family Turridae, the turrids.

Description
The length of the shell attains 22 mm.

Distribution
This marine species occurs off Hawaii and the Philippines.

References

 Powell AWB. 1967. The family Turridae in the Indo-Pacific. Part 1a. The subfamily Turrinae concluded. Indo-Pacific Moll. 1(7):409–432

weaveri
Gastropods described in 1967